Masudagawa Dam is a gravity dam located in Shimane Prefecture in Japan. The dam is used for flood control. The catchment area of the dam is 87.6 km2. The dam impounds about 54  ha of land when full and can store 6750 thousand cubic meters of water. The construction of the dam was started on 1973 and completed in 2005.

References

Dams in Shimane Prefecture
2005 establishments in Japan